Yao Zhaonan (born 27 August 1995) is a Chinese sport shooter.

He participated at the 2018 ISSF World Shooting Championships, winning a medal.

References

External links

Living people
1995 births
Chinese male sport shooters
ISSF pistol shooters
Asian Games medalists in shooting
Asian Games gold medalists for China
Shooters at the 2018 Asian Games
Medalists at the 2018 Asian Games
People from Penglai, Shandong
Sport shooters from Shandong
Sportspeople from Yantai
21st-century Chinese people